The BMW R1200ST is a sport touring motorcycle, which was introduced in 2005 by BMW Motorrad to replace the R1150RS model. The R1200ST features the same  flat-twin engine, a six-speed gearbox and shaft drive as the R1200RT. 

Though similar in specification to the RT, the ST is a sport-oriented motorcycle, with clip-on style handle bars, lighter fairing, resulting in an overall lighter weight than the RT. Luggage, in the form of panniers and a top box (or case) were available options.  ABS braking was also an option for this model.

The styling was controversial, especially the hexagon-shaped vertical headlight. Motor Cycle News referred to the styling as "quirky".

References

External links 
 BMW Motorrad R1200ST web page
 

R1200ST
Motorcycles powered by flat engines
Shaft drive motorcycles
Standard motorcycles
Motorcycles introduced in 2005